An admission note is part of a medical record that documents the patient's status (including history and physical examination findings), reasons why the patient is being admitted for inpatient care to a hospital or other facility, and the initial instructions for that patient's care.

Purpose
Admission notes document the reasons why a patient is being admitted for inpatient care to a hospital or other facility, the patient's baseline status, and the initial instructions for that patient's care.  Health care professionals use them to record a patient's baseline status and may write additional on-service notes, progress notes (SOAP notes), preoperative notes, operative notes, postoperative notes, procedure notes, delivery notes, postpartum notes, and discharge notes. These notes constitute a large part of the medical record. Medical students often develop their clinical reasoning skills by writing admission notes. The traditional, rational definition of being admitted usually involves spending an overnight in the hospital. This definition is sometimes stretched in the U.S. medical billing industry, where hospital corporations may blur the definitions of "admission" and "observation" because of reimbursement rules under which healthcare payors pay less for the care if an "admission" was involved.

Components
An admission note may sometimes be incorrectly referred to as an HPI (history of present illness) or H and P (history and physical), which include only portions of an admission note.

An admission note can include the following sections:

Outline
Not every admission note explicitly discusses every item listed below, however, the ideal admission note would include:

Header 
 Patient identifying information (maybe located separately)
 name
 ID number
 chart number
 room number
 date of birth
 attending physician
 sex
 admission date
 Date
 Time
 Service

Chief complaint (CC) 

Typically one sentence including
 age
 race
 sex
 presenting complaint
 example: "34 yo white male with right-sided weakness and slurred speech."

History of present illness (HPI)

 statement of health status
 detailed description of chief complaint
 positive and negative symptoms related to the chief complaint based on the differential diagnosis the health care provider has developed.
 emergency actions taken and patient responses if relevant

Allergies 

 first antigen and response
 second antigen and response
 etc.

Past medical history (PMHx) 
List of the patient's on-going medical problems. Chronic problems should be addressed as to whether or not they are well controlled or uncontrolled. Include dates of pertinent items.

Past surgical history (PSurgHx, PSxHx) 
List of surgeries in the past with dates of pertinent items.

Family history (FmHx) 

Health or cause of death for:
 Parents
 Siblings
 Children
 Spouse

Social history (SocHx) 

In medicine, a social history is a portion of the admission note addressing familial, occupational, and recreational aspects of the patient's personal life that have the potential to be clinically significant.

Medications 

 for each: generic name - amount - rate
 medications on arrival (aspirin, Goody's medicated powder, herbal remedies, prescriptions, etc.)
 medications on transfer

Review of systems (ROS)

 General
 Head
 Eyes
 Ears
 Nose and sinuses
 Throat, mouth, and neck
 Breasts
 Cardiovascular system
 Respiratory system
 Gastrointestinal system
 Urinary system
 Genital system
 Vascular system
 Musculoskeletal system
 Nervous system
 Psychiatric
 Hematologic system
 Endocrine system

Physical exam 

Physical examination or clinical examination is the process by which a health care provider investigates the body of a patient for signs of disease.

Labs
e.g.: electrolytes, arterial blood gases, liver function tests, etc.

Diagnostics
e.g.: EKG, CXR, CT, MRI

Assessment and plan

Assessment includes a discussion of the differential diagnosis and supporting history and exam findings.

References

See also 
 Admitting privileges

Medical terminology